In fiction, a subplot is a secondary strand of the plot that is a supporting side story for any story or for the main plot. Subplots may connect to main plots, in either time and place or thematic significance. Subplots often involve supporting characters, those besides the protagonist or antagonist. Subplots may also intertwine with the main plot at some point in a story.

Subplots are distinguished from the main plot by taking up less of the action, having fewer significant events occur, with less impact on the "world" of the work, and occurring to less important characters.  

In screenwriting, a subplot is referred to as a "B story" or a "C story," etc., while the main plot point can be referred to as the "A story".

References 

Fiction
Plot (narrative)
Literary concepts
Narratology